The Centre Independent Aragonese Candidacy (CAIC) was a regionalist political party in Spain, based in Aragon. It was founded in 1977 by dissidents from the Union of the Democratic Centre

Political parties in Aragon
Political parties established in 1977
1977 establishments in Spain